Roman Loktionov may refer to:
 Roman Loktionov (footballer, born 1985), Russian football player
 Roman Loktionov (footballer, born 1986), Ukrainian football player